Oroplema oyamana is a species of moth of the  family Uraniidae. It is found in Korea (Jeju Island), Japan (Honshu, Shikoku, Kyushu, Yakushima Island), Taiwan, northern India, Nepal, Borneo and the Philippines (Luzon).

The wingspan is 25–28 mm. The forewings are grayish brown with white hairs along to the posterior margin. The hindwings are grayish brown.

The larvae feed on Daphniphyllum himalaense and possibly Daphniphyllum teysmanni and Daphniphyllum macropodum.

References

Moths described in 1866
Uraniidae
Moths of Japan